Samer Ismail (born 8 July 1985 in Homs, Syria) is a Syrian actor known for portraying the ancient character of Umar ibn al-Khattab, the second caliph of Islam in the pan-Arab television series Omar (TV series) directed by Hatem Ali. The series was produced and broadcast by MBC. Some questioned his portrayal of the character of Omar, demanding to know Ismail's religious origin. Ismail refused to reveal his religious denomination saying that this was a personal matter and was irrelevant to his role. He also played the role of Azzam in the TV series Minbar al Mawta directed by Rasha Sharbatji. He will also appear in the upcoming film Cello, directed by Darren Lynn Bousman.

Filmography 

 Omar as Omar bin Al-Khattab

References

External links 
 
 

1985 births
Living people
People from Riyadh
Syrian Muslims
Syrian Sunni Muslims 
Syrian male film actors
Syrian male television actors
21st-century Muslims

He’s known for his work